The women's tournament at the 2021 World Team Ninepin Bowling Classic Championships was held in Tarnowo Podgórne, Poland, from 24 to 30 May 2021.

Germany captured their third title by defeating Czech Republic 7–1 in the final match. Bronze was secured by Croatia who beat Serbia 5–3.

Participating teams 

13 associations applied to participate in the women's teams competition.

Draw 

Groups were drawn on August 27, 2021 during the technical briefing in Kranj.

Groups

Group stage

Group A 

|}

Group B 

|}

Group C 

|}

Group D 

|}

Final Round

Bracket

Quarterfinals

Semifinals

Third place game

Final

Final standing

References 

2021
2021 World Team Ninepin Bowling Classic Championships